Prairieville is a census-designated place in Ascension Parish, Louisiana, United States. It is south of Baton Rouge and north of Gonzales.

Prairieville is an expanding bedroom suburb of Baton Rouge. Its name is derived from the once plentiful pastures and prairies that were visible from Highway 73 (Jefferson Hwy.) and Airline Highway, which is now covered with development. Prairieville started off as a quiet community with few people.

In recent decades, Prairieville has benefited from migration out of Baton Rouge, with new residents particularly drawn to the area by its high-performing public schools and low crime rate. Prairieville had a 2020 census population of 33,197 inhabitants. If it was incorporated it would be the largest city in Ascension Parish. Prairieville is in one of the fastest-growing areas in Louisiana. Prairieville's population is bigger than the parish's two largest incorporated cities, Donaldsonville (6,695) and Gonzales (12,231) combined.

History

Prairieville is vulnerable to hurricanes and tropical systems due to its proximity to the coast of southeast Louisiana. Hurricane Gustav caused major damage to the Prairieville area; many trees were downed and power lines were down for weeks.

Phillips Farm
The most notable local property was the Phillips Farm. The farmhouse is still a local landmark in Prairieville, although the original owner died in 2005. The house is lined with live oaks and a white planked fence surrounds the grounds. The pasture was sold in 1992 at the start of the suburban development and a 250-resident subdivision named "Seven Oaks" surrounds the farm where the pastures were.

In 2006, the farmhouse was sold at auction following the death of Dr. Carey A. Phillips.  The  tract of land (including the house) has been made into a cemetery now called Oak Lane Memorial Park.

Geography

Prairieville's latitude is 30.302N, and the longitude is -90.971W.

Demographics 

As of the 2020 United States census, there were 33,197 people, 10,928 households, and 8,428 families residing in the CDP.

Notable people
Tony Bacala
Grace Broussard who, along with Dale Houston, formed the duo Dale and Grace and had a #1 hit record in 1963, "I'm Leaving It Up to You".
Former LSU track star and Olympic athlete Lolo Jones lives in Prairieville.
State Representative Eddie J. Lambert
Sidney McCrory, Louisiana Commissioner of Agriculture and Forestry from 1956 to 1960 and a native of Ascension Parish, is interred at Prairieville Cemetery.
T. J. Moran
Joe Sevario. Louisiana State Senator
Jacob Waguespack, MLB pitcher for the Toronto Blue Jays.
Former LSU football star and former New York Giants football player Corey Webster has a home in Prairieville.
Former MLB All-Star, Will Clark San Francisco Giants has a home in Prairieville

References

Census-designated places in Ascension Parish, Louisiana
Baton Rouge metropolitan area
Census-designated places in Louisiana